Scaup is the common name for three species of diving duck:
 Greater scaup, or just "scaup", Aythya marila
 Lesser scaup, Aythya affinis
 New Zealand scaup, Aythya novaeseelandiae

External links

Birds by common name